Chatree Suwanyod (born 23 December 1965) is a Thai boxer. He competed in the men's bantamweight event at the 1992 Summer Olympics.

References

External links
 

1965 births
Living people
Chatree Suwanyod
Chatree Suwanyod
Boxers at the 1992 Summer Olympics
Place of birth missing (living people)
Bantamweight boxers